SV Estrellas is a football club based in Nort Saliña Kunuku Bieu, Kralendijk, Bonaire.

History
Since the inception of the Bonaire League, SV Estrellas has two titles to their name, in the 1998-99 and 2001-02 seasons, respectively.

Squad

References

Football clubs in Bonaire
Football clubs in the Netherlands Antilles
Kralendijk